Scy is a village and a district in the municipality of Hamois, located in the province of Namur, Belgium. 

The area has been inhabited since Neolithic times, as indicated by archaeological discoveries. The village contains several buildings from the 18th and 19th centuries. The village church is from 1847.

References

External links

Former municipalities of Namur (province)